The 1982 Philippine Basketball Association (PBA) Open Conference was the third conference of the 1982 PBA season. It started on August 22 and ended on December 14, 1982. The tournament is an Import-laden format, which requires two imports per each team.

Format
The following format will be observed for the duration of the tournament:
 The 8 participating teams are divided into two groups. Teams in the same group played each other twice while in the other group three times, totalling 18 games.
 Top two teams advances in the semifinals outright and the next four teams will dispute the last two semifinals berth in a one-round quarterfinals (back to zero standings). 
 Semifinals will be a double-round robin affairs. The top two teams in the semifinal round advance to the best-of-five finals series. The last two teams dispute the third-place trophy in a best-of-five playoff.

Imports
Each team were allowed two imports. The first line in the table are the original reinforcements of the teams. Below the name are the replacement of the import above. Same with the third replacement that is also highlighted with a different color. GP is the number of games played.

Elimination round

Quarterfinals

Semifinals

On the final playing day of the semifinals, both Gilbey's and N-Rich were a win away from advancing to the championship in the closest the PBA has ever had a finale without traditional powerhouses Toyota and Crispa, but the Super Corollas forces a playoff with N-Rich Coffee and won their knockout game to play first-time finalist Gilbey's Gin.

Second seed playoff

Finals

References

PBA Open Conference
Open Conference